Decalage on a fixed-wing aircraft is the angle difference between the upper and lower wings of a biplane, i.e. the acute angle contained between the chords of the wings in question.

Decalage is said to be positive when the upper wing has a higher angle of incidence than the lower wing, and negative when the lower wing's incidence is greater than that of the upper wing. Positive decalage results in greater lift from the upper wing than the lower wing, the difference increasing with the amount of decalage.

In a survey of representative biplanes, real-life design decalage is typically zero, with both wings having equal incidence.  A notable exception is the Stearman PT-17, which has 4° of incidence in the lower wing, and 3° in the upper wing.  Considered from an aerodynamic perspective, it is desirable to have the forward-most wing stall first, which will induce a pitch-down moment, aiding in stall recovery.  Biplane designers may use incidence to control stalling behavior, but may also use airfoil selection or other means to accomplish correct behavior.

Decalage angle can also refer to the difference in angle of the chord line of the wing and the chord line of the horizontal stabilizer. This is different from the angle of incidence, which refers to the angle of the wing chord to the longitudinal axis of the fuselage, without reference to the horizontal stabilizer.

References

External links
National Advisory Committee for Aeronautics test reports accessed through the Cranfield University AERADE website.

Aerospace engineering